is a Tiger Mask anime series which premiered on October 1, 2016, with 38 episodes.

The opening theme is "Ike! Tiger Mask" ( 行け!タイガーマスク; Go! Tiger Mask) by Shonan no Kaze and the ending theme is "KING OF THE WILD" also by Shonan no Kaze. The opening theme is a new rendition of the opening in the original Tiger Mask, which was originally performed by Hideyo Morimoto. The show airs on TV Asahi's 26:45 (2:45 AM) time slot on Saturday, technically Sunday morning.

Episode list

Notes

References

External links 
 
  
  at TV Asahi 

Tiger Mask W